This is a list of members of the Western Australian Legislative Assembly between the 1917 election and the 1921 election, together known as the 10th Parliament.

Notes
 The Labor member for Subiaco, Bartholomew James Stubbs, died in action in Belgium on 26 September 1917. At the resulting by-election on 10 November 1917, the Nationalist candidate, Samuel Brown, was successful.
 The Nationalist member for Claremont, John Stewart, resigned on 30 August 1918. At the resulting by-election on 14 September 1918, the Nationalist candidate, Thomas Duff, was successful.
 Sir James Mitchell, member for Northam, was appointed by Premier Hal Colebatch as Minister for Lands and Repatriation on 17 April 1919. Mitchell was therefore required to resign and contest a ministerial by-election, at which he was declared elected upon the close of nominations on 24 April 1919. He himself became premier three weeks later after the failure of the Colebatch Ministry.
 The Nationalist member for Albany, Herbert Robinson, died on 2 May 1919. At the resulting by-election on 31 May 1919, the National Labor candidate, former Premier John Scaddan, was successful.
 Thomas Draper, member for West Perth, was appointed by Premier James Mitchell as Attorney-General on 17 May 1919. Draper was therefore required to resign and contest a ministerial by-election, at which he was successful against an Independent candidate on 7 June 1919.
 Frank Broun, member for Beverley, was appointed by Premier James Mitchell as Colonial Secretary on 25 June 1919. Broun was therefore required to resign and contest a ministerial by-election, at which he was returned unopposed at the close of nominations on 10 July 1919.
 The National Labor member for Mount Leonora, George Foley, resigned on 18 November 1920, to run as the Nationalist candidate for the federal seat of Kalgoorlie at a by-election following the expulsion of Hugh Mahon from the Australian House of Representatives. At the resulting by-election on 20 December 1920, the Labor candidate, Thomas Heron, was successful.

Sources
 
 

Members of Western Australian parliaments by term